Roehampton Estate was a plantation in St James Parish, Jamaica. It was the scene of substantial destruction during the Baptist War (1831-2).

The estate was owned by John Baillie, an absentee plantation owner who lived in Montagu Square, London. Following his death in October 1832, his estate received £5745 0s 3d under the Compensation act for the emancipation of 322 enslaved Africans.

In 1850, Isaac Jackson bought the estate.

See also
 List of plantations in Jamaica

References

Slave rebellions in North America
Saint James Parish, Jamaica
Plantations in Jamaica